The RMS Lancastria was a British navy ship sunk in 1940 with the loss of about 4000 lives.

Lancastria may also refer to:
 Lancastria, a British Rail Class 40 diesel locomotive D223
 A paleozoic fossil of Pennsylvania

See also
Lancashire, a British county and former duchy
Lancastrian (disambiguation)